The alkylbenzenes are derivatives of benzene, in which one or more hydrogen atoms are replaced by alkyl groups of different sizes. They are a subset of the aromatic hydrocarbons. The simplest member is toluene, in which a hydrogen atom of the benzene was replaced by a methyl group.

Literature 
 Allinger, Cava, de Jongh, Johnson, Lebel, Stevens: Organische Chemie, 1. Auflage, Walter de Gruyter, Berlin 1980, pp. 367–368, 560–562.
 Streitwieser / Heathcock: Organische Chemie, 1. Auflage, Verlag Chemie, Weinheim 1980, pp. 1051, 1073–1080.
 Beyer / Walter: Lehrbuch der Organischen Chemie, 19. Auflage, S. Hirzel Verlag, Stuttgart 1981, pp. 442–444.
 Morrison / Boyd: Lehrbuch der Organischen Chemie, 3. Auflage, Verlag Chemie, Weinheim 1986, pp. 707–728.